Getriin Strigin (born 7 July 1996) is an Estonian football goalkeeper who currently plays for FC Wacker Innsbruck  and the Estonian women's national football team.

Honours 

FC Flora
Naiste Meistriliiga: 2018 
Estonian Women's Cup: 2018, 2019
Estonian Women's Supercup: 2018, 2019

References 

1996 births
Living people
Estonian women's footballers
Estonia women's international footballers
Sportspeople from Jõgeva
Women's association football goalkeepers
FC Flora (women) players
Estonian expatriate footballers
Estonian expatriate sportspeople in Spain
Expatriate footballers in Spain
Estonian expatriate sportspeople in Austria
Expatriate footballers in Austria